Vällingby is a station on the Green line of the Stockholm metro. It is located in the district of Vällingby, which is part of the borough of Hässelby-Vällingby in the west of the city of Stockholm. The station is nominally above ground and has a two island platforms and three through tracks, with access from a station building spanning the tracks. This station building forms part of the cultural and retail centre of Vällingby, much of which has subsequently been built over the tracks and platforms of the metro, giving it an underground feel.

The station was opened on 26 October 1952 as the west terminus of the stretch from Hötorget as provisional station and opened as a permanent station on 6 April 1954. On 1 November 1956 the line was extended further west to Hässelby gård.

As part of Art in the Stockholm metro project, the station features concrete trees on the platforms, created by Casimir Djuric in 1983.

The Vällingby metro depot (Vällingby t-banedepå) is located to the east of the station and accessed from the station by a grade-separated junction.

Gallery

References

External links
Images of Vällingby station

Green line (Stockholm metro) stations
Railway stations opened in 1952